Royal Air Force Operational Training Units (OTUs) were training units that prepared aircrew for operations on a particular type or types of aircraft or roles.

OTUs

No. 1 (Coastal) Operational Training Unit RAF (1 OTU) The Unit was formed in 1940 as part of RAF Coastal Command at RAF Silloth for training aircrew on coastal command patrol aircraft types until it was disbanded on 19 October 1943. 

No. 2 (Coastal) Operational Training Unit RAF (2 OTU) 2 OTU was formed in 1940 as part of Coastal Command at RAF Catfoss for training aircrew on coastal command twin-engined fighter and strike aircraft types until it was disbanded 15 February 1944.

No. 3 (Coastal) Operational Training Unit RAF (3 OTU) 3 OTU was formed in 1940 as part of Coastal Command at RAF Catfoss for training aircrew on coastal command aircraft types including the Avro Anson and Bristol Beaufighter, until it was disbanded 4 January 1944.

No. 4 (Coastal) Operational Training Unit RAF (4 OTU) 4 OTU was formed in 1941 as part of Coastal Command at RAF Stranraer for training aircrew on coastal command flying boats until it was disbanded, when it became 235 OCU in 1947.

No. 5 Operational Training Unit RAF (5 OTU) 5 OTU was formed in 1940 as part of No. 12 Group Fighter Command at RAF Aston Down for training fighter pilots until it was disbanded 1 August 1945.

No. 6 Operational Training Unit RAF (6 OTU) 6 OTU was formed in March 1940 at RAF Sutton Bridge for training fighter pilots, commanded by Squadron Leader Philip Campbell Pinkham, with a complement of Hawker Hurricane, Miles Mentor, and North American Harvard aircraft, including one Gloster Gladiator.  Its first pilot pool came from No. 11 Group RAF transferring to No. 12 Group RAF of Fighter Command.  No. 6 OTU was re-numbered in November 1940 to No. 56 OTU, and remained at RAF Sutton Bridge until relocating in March 1942 to RAF Tealing.

No. 7 Operational Training Unit RAF (7 OTU) 7 OTU was formed in 1940 as part of Fighter Command at RAF Hawarden to train fighter pilots.  During the Battle of Britain in September 1940, it flew operational flights over north west England, claiming three enemy aircraft shot down.  It was re-designated No. 57 OTU on 1 November 1940.

No. 7 (Coastal) Operational Training Unit RAF (7 (C)OTU) 7 (C)OTU was formed on 1 April 1942 at RAF Limavady.

No. 8 (Coastal) Operational Training Unit RAF (8 OTU) 8 OTU was formed on 18 May 1942 at RAF Fraserburgh, by merging the Photographic Reconnaissance Conversion Flight of 3 School of General Reconnaissance, RAF Squires Gate and 'K' (Photographic Reconnaissance Advanced Training) Flight of 1 Photographic Reconnaissance Unit (1PRU), RAF Detling.  It was part of No. 17 Group Coastal Command.  It trained aircrew on a wide range of photo-reconnaissance aircraft, including the Supermarine Spitfire and de Havilland Mosquito.  It was disbanded when it became 237 OCU in 1947.

No. 9 (Coastal) Operational Training Unit RAF (9 OTU) 9 OTU was formed in 1942 as part of No. 17 Group Coastal Command at RAF Aldergrove to train long-range fighter aircrew, it was disbanded on 11 August 1944.

No. 10 Operational Training Unit RAF (10 OTU) 10 OTU was formed in 1940 as part of No. 8 Group RAF Bomber Command at RAF Abingdon to train night bomber aircrew, it was disbanded on 10 September 1946.

No. 11 Operational Training Unit RAF (11 OTU) 11 OTU was formed in 1940 as part of No. 6 Group RAF Bomber Command at RAF Bassingbourn to train night bomber aircrew.  During 1942, it operated seven operational night bombing missions.  In September 1942, it moved to RAF Westcott and its satellite station RAF Oakley.  It was disbanded on 18 September 1945.

No. 12 Operational Training Unit RAF (12 OTU) 12 OTU was formed in April 1940 as part of No. 1 Group RAF Bomber Command at RAF Benson to train light bomber aircrew; absorbed No. 52 Squadron RAF on 8 April 1940.  During 1942, 12 OTU carried out operational night bombing missions.  The Unit was disbanded on 22 June 1945.

No. 13 Operational Training Unit RAF (13 OTU) 13 OTU was formed in April 1940 as part of No. 6 Group RAF Bomber Command at RAF Bicester to train originally Bristol Blenheim light day bomber aircrew.  It was disbanded when it became 228 OCU in 1947.

No. 14 Operational Training Unit RAF (14 OTU) 14 OTU was formed in April 1940 as part of No. 6 Group RAF Bomber Command at RAF Cottesmore to train night bomber crews.  It later came under the control of No. 92 Group when it reformed at RAF Market Harborough in August 1943.  It was disbanded on 24 June 1945.

No. 15 Operational Training Unit RAF (15 OTU) 15 OTU was formed in August 1940 as part of No. 6 Group RAF Bomber Command at RAF Harwell to train night bomber crews on the Vickers Wellington.  In 1942, it carried out seven operational missions.  It was disbanded in March 1944.

No. 16 Operational Training Unit RAF (16 OTU) 16 OTU was formed in April 1940 as part of No. 6 Group RAF Bomber Command at RAF Upper Heyford to train night bomber crews using the Handley Page Hampden and Hereford.  It converted to the Vickers Wellington in 1942, and carried out a number of operational sorties.  It was disbanded in January 1945.

No. 17 Operational Training Unit RAF (17 OTU) 17 OTU was formed in April 1940 as part of No. 6 Group RAF Bomber Command at RAF Upwood to train light bomber crews using the Bristol Blenheim.  It moved to RAF Silverstone in April 1943 to train night bomber crews with the Vickers Wellington.  It was re-designated No. 201 Advanced Flying School in March 1947.

No. 18 Operational Training Unit RAF (18 OTU) 18 OTU was formed in June 1940 from the Polish Training Unit as part of No. 6 Group RAF Bomber Command to train light bomber crews for the Polish Boulton Paul Defiant squadrons at RAF Hucknall.  Converted to the Vickers Wellington in 1942, and carried out six operational sorties as part of No. 91 Group.  Disbanded in January 1945.

No. 19 Operational Training Unit RAF (19 OTU) 19 OTU was formed in May 1940 at RAF Kinloss to train night bomber crews using the Armstrong Whitworth Whitley.  In June 1942, twelve Whitleys took part in a raid against Bremen.  Re-equipped with the Vickers Wellington from August 1944 until it was disbanded in June 1945.

No. 20 Operational Training Unit RAF (20 OTU) 20 OTU was formed in May 1940 at RAF Lossiemouth to train night bomber crews using the Vickers Wellington.  It disbanded in July 1945.

No. 21 Operational Training Unit RAF (21 OTU) 21 OTU was formed in January 1941 at RAF Moreton-in-Marsh to train night bomber crews using the Vickers Wellington.  In 1942, it carried out a number of operational sorties.  It moved to RAF Finningley in November 1946, before being re-designated No. 202 Advanced Flying School RAF in March 1947.

No. 22 Operational Training Unit RAF (22 OTU) 22 OTU was formed in April 1941 at RAF Wellesbourne Mountford as part of No. 6 Group RAF Bomber Command to train night bomber crews with the Vickers Wellington.  Disbanded in July 1945.

No. 23 Operational Training Unit RAF (23 OTU) 23 OTU was formed in April 1941 at RAF Pershore as part of No. 6 Group RAF Bomber Command to train night bomber crews using the Vickers Wellington.  Carried out operational sorties during 1942, and was disbanded in March 1944, with most of the aircraft moving to No. 22 OTU.

No. 24 Operational Training Unit RAF (24 OTU) The Unit was formed in March 1942 at RAF Honeybourne as part of No. 7 Group RAF Bomber Command to train night bomber crews using the Armstrong Whitworth Whitley.  Carried out three operational sorties during 1942.  Converted to the Vickers Wellington in April 1944 to train Royal Canadian Air Force crews, disbanded in July 1945.

No. 25 Operational Training Unit RAF (25 OTU) 25 OTU was formed in March 1941 at RAF Finningley as part of No. 7 Group RAF Bomber Command to train night bomber crews using the Handley Page Hampden, after operating a variety of types, it became a Vickers Wellington unit in April 1942.  It carried out a number of operational raids during 1942.  Disbanded in February 1943.

No. 26 Operational Training Unit RAF (26 OTU) 26 OTU was formed in January 1942 at RAF Wing as part of No. 7 Group RAF Bomber Command to train night bomber crews using the Vickers Wellington.  Disbanded in March 1946.

No. 27 Operational Training Unit RAF (27 OTU) 27 OTU was formed in April 1941 at RAF Lichfield as part of No. 6 Group RAF Bomber Command to train night bomber crews using the Vickers Wellington.  Trained Royal Australian Air Force crews in 1942, and it was disbanded in June 1945.

No. 28 Operational Training Unit RAF (28 OTU) 28 OTU was formed in May 1942 at RAF Wymeswold as part of No. 92 Group RAF Bomber Command to train night bomber crews using the Vickers Wellington.  Disbanded in October 1944.

No. 29 Operational Training Unit RAF (29 OTU) 29 OTU was formed in April 1942 at RAF North Luffenham as part of No. 7 Group RAF Bomber Command to train night bomber crews using the Vickers Wellington.  Carried four operation sorties during 1942.  Disbanded in May 1945.

No. 30 Operational Training Unit RAF (30 OTU) 30 OTU was formed in June 1942 at RAF Hixon as part of No. 93 Group RAF Bomber Command to train night bomber crews using the Vickers Wellington.  Disbanded in June 1945.

No. 31 Operational Training Unit RAF (31 OTU) 31 OTU was formed in May 1941 at Debert, Nova Scotia, as part of No. 3 Training Command, to general reconnaissance crews using the Lockheed Hudson and Avro Anson.  Carried out operational patrols in the Western Atlantic from Dartmouth.  Operated the de Havilland Mosquito from May 1944, and it was disbanded in July 1944 when it was replaced by No. 7 Operational Training Unit RCAF.

No. 32 Operational Training Unit RAF (32 OTU) 32 OTU was formed at West Kirby, Liverpool, the personnel then moved by ship to Patricia Bay, British Columbia, as part of No. 4 Training Command.  Tasked to train general reconnaissance crews, and the first Avro Ansons arrived in September 1941, and Bristol Beaufighters arrived in October 1942.  With the start of the war in the Pacific, the unit was declared an operational squadron to protect the Canadian coast from Japanese raids and re-designated No. 32 Operational Squadron on 15 December 1941.  After a few days mounting patrols, it became clear that the Japanese were unlikely to attack Canada, and it reverted to an Operational Training Unit on 29 December 1941.  Re-designated No. 6 Operational Training Unit RCAF in June 1944.

No. 34 Operational Training Unit RAF (34 OTU) 34 OTU was formed in April 1942 in the United Kingdom, the personnel then moved by ship to Yarmouth, Nova Scotia, as part of No. 3 Training Command to train general reconnaissance crews.  The first Avro Ansons arrived in May 1942.  Disbanded in May 1944.

No. 36 Operational Training Unit RAF (36 OTU) 36 OTU was formed in February 1942 in the United Kingdom, the personnel then moved by ship to Greenwood, Nova Scotia, as part of No. 3 Training Command to train general reconnaissance crews using the Lockheed Hudson.  Later became No. 8 Operational Training Unit RCAF.

No. 41 Operational Training Unit RAF (41 OTU) 41 OTU was formed in September 1941 at RAF Old Sarum to train tactical reconnaissance pilots.

No. 42 Operational Training Unit RAF (42 OTU) 42 OTU was formed in July `1941 at RAF Andover to train army support crews.

No. 43 Operational Training Unit RAF (43 OTU) 43 OTU was formed in October 1942 at RAF Larkhill to train army co-operation air observers for deployment on the Auster.  Moved to Old Sarum soon after formation, to the satellite site at Oatlands Hill in February 1944, and to Andover in August 1944, became No. 227 Operational Conversion Unit RAF.

No. 51 Operational Training Unit RAF (51 OTU) 51 OTU was formed in July 1941 at RAF Debden to train night fighter crews.

No. 52 Operational Training Unit RAF (52 OTU) 52 OTU was formed in March 1941 at RAF Debden to train fighter pilots using the Hawker Hurricane.

No. 53 Operational Training Unit RAF (53 OTU) 53 OTU was formed in February 1941 at RAF Heston to train fighter pilots using the Supermarine Spitfire.

No. 54 Operational Training Unit RAF (54 OTU) 54 OTU was formed in November 1940 at RAF Church Fenton to train night fighter crews.

No. 55 Operational Training Unit RAF (55 OTU) 55 OTU was formed in November 1940 at RAF Aston Down to train fighter pilots.

No. 56 Operational Training Unit RAF (56 OTU) Previously designated No. 6 OTU, formed in March 1940 at RAF Sutton Bridge and re-numbered in November 1940 to 56 OTU, where it remained at RAF Sutton Bridge until relocating in March 1942 to RAF Tealing.

No. 57 Operational Training Unit RAF (57 OTU) 57 OTU was formed in November 1940 at RAF Hawarden to train single-seat fighter pilots.

No. 58 Operational Training Unit RAF (58 OTU) 58 OTU was formed in December 1940 at RAF Grangemouth to train day fighter pilots.  No. 58 OTU was re-formed in March 1945 at RAF Poulton with Spitfires.

No. 59 Operational Training Unit RAF (59 OTU) 59 OTU was formed in December 1940 at RAF Turnhouse to train single-seat fighter pilots.  No. 59 OTU was re-formed in February 1945 at RAF Acklington to train fighter-bomber pilots using the Hawker Typhoon.

No. 60 Operational Training Unit RAF (60 OTU) 60 OTU was formed in April 1941 at RAF Leconfield to train night fighter crews using the Blenheim and Defiant, subsequently moving to RAF East Fortune and converting to Beaufighter training.  In November 1942, it transferred to Coastal Command, and was renumbered 132 OTU.  No. 60 OTU was re-formed in May 1943 at RAF High Ercall to train intruder crews using the de Havilland Mosquito.

No. 61 Operational Training Unit RAF (61 OTU) 61 OTU was formed in June 1941 at RAF Heston to train single-seat fighter pilots.

No. 62 Operational Training Unit RAF (62 OTU) 62 OTU was formed in August 1942 at RAF Usworth to train observers / radio operators in the Air Intercept role.

No. 63 Operational Training Unit RAF (63 OTU) 63 OTU was formed in August 1943 at RAF Honiley to train night fighter crews.

No. 70 (Middle East) Operational Training Unit RAF (70 OTU) 70 (Middle East) OTU was formed in December 1949 for training in middle east conditions at RAF Ismailia.

No. 71 Operational Training Unit RAF (7 1OTU) 71 OTU was formed in June 1941 at RAF Ismailia for desert training. "From June to September 1941 it was providing night defence of the Canal Zone (Suez Canal), and then in September it moved to Gordon’s Tree near Khartoum in the Sudan." Among aircraft operated was the Tomahawk.

No. 72 Operational Training Unit RAF (72 OTU) 72 OTU was formed in November 1941 at RAF Carthago to train light bomber crews in tropical conditions.

No. 73 Operational Training Unit RAF (73 OTU) No.73 OTU was formed in November 1941 at RAF Sheikh Othman, Aden, for training in desert conditions, initially using two Mohawks and a Hurricane.

No. 74 Operational Training Unit RAF (74 OTU) 74 OTU was formed in October 1941 at RAF Aqir for army co-operation training, and to teach tactical reconnaissance skills in the desert, using the Hawker Hurricane.

No. 75 Operational Training Unit RAF (75 OTU) 75 OTU was formed in December 1942 at RAF Gianaclis to train general reconnaissance crews using the Lockheed Hudson.

No. 76 Operational Training Unit RAF (76 OTU) 76 OTU was formed in October 1943 at RAF Aqir to train night bomber crews using Vickers Wellington.

No. 77 Operational Training Unit RAF (77 OTU) 77 OTU was formed in January 1944 at RAF Qastina to train night bomber crews using the Vickers Wellington.

No. 78 Operational Training Unit RAF the Unit was formed in February 1944 at RAF Ein Shemer to train general reconnaissance crews, particularly using ASV radar and the Leigh light.

No. 79 Operational Training Unit RAF (79 OTU) 79 OTU was formed in February 1944 at RAF Nicosia to train general reconnaissance and strike crews.

No. 80 (French) Operational Training Unit RAF (80 OTU) 80 OTU was formed in April 1945 at RAF Morpeth to train French fighter pilots using the Supermarine Spitfire and Miles Master.

No. 81 Operational Training Unit RAF (81 OTU) 81 OTU was formed in July 1942 at RAF Ashbourne to train night bomber crews with the Armstrong Whitworth Whitley.

No. 82 Operational Training Unit RAF (82 OTU) 82 OTU was formed in June 1943 at RAF Ossington to train night bomber crews with the Vickers Wellington.

No. 83 Operational Training Unit RAF (83 OTU) 83 OTU was formed in August 1943 at RAF Child's Ercall to train night bomber crews with the Vickers Wellington.

No. 84 Operational Training Unit RAF (84 OTU) 84 OTU was formed in September 1943 at RAF Desborough to train night bomber crews with the Vickers Wellington.

No. 85 Operational Training Unit RAF (85 OTU) 84 OTU was formed in June 1944 at RAF Husbands Bosworth to train night bomber crews with the Vickers Wellington.

No. 86 Operational Training Unit RAF (86 OTU) 86 OTU was formed in June 1944 at RAF Gamston to train night bomber crews with the Vickers Wellington.

No. 101 (Glider) Operational Training Unit RAF (101 OTU) Formed in April 1942 at RAF Kidlington as part of No. 70 Group to train glider pilots using the General Aircraft Hotspur.

No. 102 (Glider) Operational Training Unit RAF (102 OTU) Formed in February 1942 at RAF Kidlington as part of No. 70 Group to train glider pilots using the Hotspur.

No. 104 (Transport) Operational Training Unit RAF (104 OTU) Formed in March 1943 at RAF Nutts Corner to crews on transport aircraft using the Vickers Wellington.

No. 105 (Transport) Operational Training Unit RAF (105 OTU) Formed in April 1944 at RAF Bramcote to train crews for airline transport squadrons, at first using the Vickers Wellington, but by September 1944, with the Douglas Dakota.

No. 107 (Transport) Operational Training Unit RAF (107 OTU) Formed in May 1944 at RAF Leicester East to train transport and glider tug crews using the Douglas Dakota and Airspeed Horsa glider.

No. 108 (Transport) Operational Training Unit RAF (108 OTU) Formed in October 1944 at RAF Wymeswold to train transport crews using the Douglas Dakota.

No. 109 (Transport) Operational Training Unit RAF (109 OTU) Formed in August 1944 at RAF Crosby-on-Eden to train transport crews using the Douglas Dakota.

No. 111 (Coastal) Operational Training Unit RAF (111 OTU) Formed in August 1942 in the Bahamas to train general reconnaissance crews using the North American Mitchell and Consolidated Liberators.

No. 131 (Coastal) Operational Training Unit RAF (131 OTU) Formed in July 1942 at RAF Killadeas as part of No. 15 Group Coastal Command to train crews on the Consolidated Catalina.

No. 132 (Coastal) Operational Training Unit RAF (132 OTU) Formed in November 1942 at RAF East Fortune as part of No. 17 Group Coastal Command to train long-range fighter and strike training using the Bristol Blenheim, Bristol Beaufighter, and later, de Havilland Mosquito.

No. 151 (Fighter) Operational Training Unit RAF (151 OTU) Formed in July 1942 at RAF Risalpur as part of No. 227 Group to train pilots out of Indian flying training schools.

No. 152 (Bomber) Operational Training Unit RAF (152 OTU) Formed in October 1942 at RAF Peshawar as part of No. 227 Group to train pilots out of Indian flying training schools.

No. 1 Operational Training Unit, India (1 (India) OTU) Formed April 1942 at RAF Risalpur as part of No. 1 (Indian) Group to train fighter pilots in an Indian environment.

See also

Royal Air Force

List of Royal Air Force aircraft squadrons
List of Royal Air Force aircraft independent flights
List of conversion units of the Royal Air Force
List of Royal Air Force Glider units
List of Royal Air Force schools
List of Royal Air Force units & establishments
List of RAF squadron codes
List of RAF Regiment units
List of Battle of Britain squadrons
List of wings of the Royal Air Force
Royal Air Force roundels

Army Air Corps

List of Army Air Corps aircraft units

Fleet Air Arm

List of Fleet Air Arm aircraft squadrons
List of Fleet Air Arm groups
List of aircraft units of the Royal Navy
List of aircraft wings of the Royal Navy

Others

List of Air Training Corps squadrons
University Air Squadron
Air Experience Flight
Volunteer Gliding Squadron
United Kingdom military aircraft serial numbers
United Kingdom aircraft test serials
British military aircraft designation systems

Notes

References

 
Operational Training Units